The following highways are numbered 887:

United States